Three naval vessels of Japan have been named Kongō:
  (1912–1945), the nameship of her class of battlecruisers, which were later modified into battleships.
 , launched in 1991, also the nameship of her class of destroyers.

Additionally, two Japanese ships have been named Kongō Maru:
 , passenger-cargo ship launched in 1934, sunk in 1942
 , passenger-cargo ship launched in 1936, wrecked in 1951

Imperial Japanese Navy ship names
Japanese Navy ship names